The Ersal Commercial Center, also known as the Al-Ersal real-estate project, is a $400 million commercial development under construction in Ramallah, Palestine.    The project is co-sponsored by the Palestine Investment Fund (PIF) and The Land Holding, a Saudi real estate company, which have created a new development company called Arduna to construct the Ersal Center.  Ground was broken in October 2008 on the projected 4-year development project.

References

Buildings and structures in Ramallah